Bolshoye Zaymishche is a rural locality (a village) in Pertsevskoye Rural Settlement, Gryazovetsky District, Vologda Oblast, Russia. The population was 30 as of 2002.

Geography 
Bolshoye Zaymishche is located 30 km northeast of Gryazovets (the district's administrative centre) by road. Yezhovo is the nearest rural locality.

References 

Rural localities in Gryazovetsky District